Immacolata Cerasuolo (born 18 June 1980) is a Paralympic swimmer for Italy.

Career
A promising swimmer since childhood, she became an athlete with disability category S8 following 
a motorbike accident that left her without use of her right arm.

She has competed in two Paralympic Games (2004 Athens and 2008 Beijing),
winning one gold and one silver medal.
She also took part in the IPC Swimming World Championships in Mar del Plata (Argentina) in 2002 and in Durban (South Africa) in 2006, winning 2 silver medals.

External links 
 
  
  
 

1980 births
Living people
Paralympic swimmers of Italy
Paralympic gold medalists for Italy
Paralympic silver medalists for Italy
Swimmers at the 2004 Summer Paralympics
Medalists at the 2004 Summer Paralympics
Paralympic medalists in swimming
S8-classified Paralympic swimmers
Italian female butterfly swimmers
Italian female medley swimmers
Swimmers from Naples
21st-century Italian women